Zephyrarchaea marki, the Cape Le Grand assassin spider, is a spider in the family Archaeidae. The species was first described by Michael G. Rix and Mark Harvey in 2012. It is endemic to Cape Le Grand National Park in Australia.

Taxonomy 
The holotype of the species was collected in Thistle Cove in Cape Le Grand National Park in Western Australia. The specific epithet is in honour of Mark Wojcieszek, who helped discover the first specimens of the species.

Description 
The males of the species are 2.77–2.79 mm in length.

Distribution and habitat 
The species is known only from its type locality at Thistle Cove at Cape Le Grand National Park. They were found in leaf litter in a dense coastal thicket of Banksia speciosa.

Conservation 
The species is endemic and has an extremely small range, with the only known population at the Cape Le Grand National Park possibly being threatened by fire, dieback disease, and climate change.

References 

Spiders described in 2012
Archaeidae